Homer Slate Taylor (August 19, 1851 – January 7, 1933) was an American archer. He competed in the men's double York round, men's double American round, and the men's team round at the 1904 Summer Olympics.

He is a member of the Archery Hall of Fame.

References

External links
 

1851 births
1933 deaths
Olympic archers of the United States
American male archers
Archers at the 1904 Summer Olympics
People from Leyden, Massachusetts
Sportspeople from Massachusetts